was the 13th and last daimyō of Ōzu Domain, Japan. The second son of Katō Yasumoto, Yasuaki succeeded his elder brother Yasutomi upon the latter's death in 1864. Ōzu Domain and the other han or fiefs were abolished in 1871.

1846 births
1926 deaths
Daimyo